Showdown at Abilene is a 1956 American Western film directed by Charles F. Haas (as Charles Haas) and starring Jock Mahoney, Martha Hyer and Lyle Bettger.

It was remade as Gunfight in Abilene.

Plot
Jim Trask, former sheriff of Abilene, returns to the town after fighting for the Confederacy to find everyone thought he was dead. His old friend Dave Mosely is now engaged to Trask's former sweetheart and is one of the cattlemen increasingly feuding with the original farmers. Trask is persuaded to take up as sheriff again but there is something about the death of Mosely's brother in the Civil War that is haunting him.

Cast
 Jock Mahoney as Jim Trask
 Martha Hyer as Peggy Bigelow
 Lyle Bettger as Dave Mosely
 David Janssen as Verne Ward
 Grant Williams as Chip Tomlin
 Ted de Corsia as Dan Claudius
 Harry Harvey as Ross Bigelow (as Harry Harvey)
 Dayton Lummis as Jack Bedford 
 Richard H. Cutting as Nelson
 Robert Anderson as Sprague (as Robert G. Anderson)
 John Maxwell as Frank Scovie
 Lane Bradford as Loop

See also
 List of American films of 1956

External links
  
 

1956 films
Films directed by Charles F. Haas
1950s English-language films
American Western (genre) films
1950s American films